Tim Billingsley (born 17 January 1990) is a British ice hockey player who most recently played for the Nottingham Panthers and the British national team.

He represented Great Britain at the 2019 IIHF World Championship.

References

External links

1990 births
Arizona Coyotes draft picks
Brampton Beast players
British ice hockey defencemen
Carleton Ravens players
Ice hockey people from Ottawa
Living people
Mississauga St. Michael's Majors players
Niagara IceDogs players
Nottingham Panthers players
Rio Grande Valley Killer Bees players
Toronto St. Michael's Majors players